ʿUthman ibn Muḥammad ibn Abī Sufyān was a member of the Umayyad ruling family who served as the governor of Medina under the Umayyad caliph Yazid I in 682 until being expelled by its townspeople in 683 during the Second Fitna.

Life

Uthman belonged to the Banu Umayya clan and was a grandson of Abu Sufyan ibn Harb, making him a paternal cousin of Caliph Yazid I. The latter appointed Uthman governor of Medina in 682, replacing their other cousin, al-Walid ibn Utba ibn Abi Sufyan. According to an account recorded in the history of the 9th-century historian al-Tabari, Uthman's appointment came about as a result of a ploy by the Mecca-based, anti-Umayyad claimant to the caliphate, Abd Allah ibn al-Zubayr. The latter had sent a letter disparaging al-Walid ibn Utba as unfit and suggesting he be replaced by a governor more inclined to cooperation. Yazid responded by installing Uthman. According to the historian Julius Wellhausen, Uthman was "a young man, inexperienced and conceited". 

In an effort to conciliate the growing opposition to Yazid in Medina, Uthman sent an embassy of city notables to Yazid's court in Damascus in hopes that the caliph would secure their support with financial incentives; though Yazid gave them numerous gifts, they returned to Medina with reports of the caliph's misdeeds and lack of religion. Afterward, the townspeople of Medina, led by a member of the embassy, Abd Allah ibn Hanzala, revolted against Yazid and assaulted Uthman. The Banu Umayya and their mawali (non-Arab clients) and supporters among the Quraysh, numbering some 1,000 people, were likewise attacked and found refuge with the senior Umayyad of the region, Marwan ibn al-Hakam. Uthman, being "only a young lad without any judgement", according to al-Tabari, was sidelined by Marwan who managed the Hejazi Umayyads during this crisis. The Umayyads ultimately relocated to Syria, the political center of the Umayyad Caliphate. There is scant information available about Uthman beyond his short term in Medina. One of his daughters, Atika, was later wed to the Umayyad caliph al-Walid II.

References

Bibliography

 
 
 
 

7th-century Arabs
People of the Second Fitna
Umayyad dynasty
Umayyad governors of Medina